Anna Júlia Csiki (born 14 November 1999) is a Hungarian footballer who plays as a midfielder and has appeared for the Hungary women's national team.

Career
Anna Csiki has been capped for the Hungary national team, appearing for the team during the UEFA Women's Euro 2021 qualifying cycle.

International goals
Scores and results listed Hungary's goal tally first.

References

External links
 
 
 

1999 births
Living people
Hungarian women's footballers
Hungary women's international footballers
Women's association football midfielders
Damallsvenskan players
BK Häcken FF players
Ferencvárosi TC (women) footballers